Katharina Valenta  was a famous Sicilian courtesan in the 17th century. She was the lover of many rich men and princes. Through the preacher Carlo Carafa, she was converted to a different way of life and helped him from in the rescue and support of prostitutes. This made her an early champion of the rights of "fallen" women.

References

 S. di Giacomo, La prostituzione a Napoli, 1899
 Picture Dictionary of Eroticism, Vienna, 1928-1931

Italian courtesans
Italian female prostitutes
Year of birth missing
Year of death missing
17th-century Italian women